Eduardo López may refer to:

 Eduardo López (fencer) (1926–?), Guatemalan Olympic fencer
 Eduardo López (film editor), Argentine film editor
 Eduardo López Banzo (born 1961), Spanish harpsichordist and conductor
 Eduardo López de Romaña (1847–1912), President of Peru
 Eduardo López Ochoa (1877–1936), Spanish general
 Eduardo Alejandro López (born 1989), Argentine footballer
 Eduardo López Alcaraz (born 1964), American artist who uses the pseudonym Lalo Alcaraz
 Eduardo López Rivas (1850–1913), Venezuelan journalist
 Eduardo López Riaza (born 1964), Spanish wheelchair basketball player